Jeffrey Weeks  (born 1945, in Rhondda, Wales) is a gay activist and an historian and sociologist specialising in work on sexuality.

Career

Weeks is among the academics in the early period of gay men's studies in Britain that emerged from the Gay Liberation Front (GLF) which he joined in 1970 and the Gay Left of which he was a founding member.

Weeks is the author of several books, including Coming Out (Quartet, 1977), a study of the history of homosexual politics in Britain, Sex, Politics and Society (Longman, 1981), and Sexuality and Its Discontents (Routledge, 1985).

He has been on the editorial board of several journals including History Workshop Journal, the Journal of the History of Sexuality, the Journal of Homosexuality, and Victorian Studies.

He was the Executive Dean of Arts and Human Sciences at London South Bank University (2003–2008). He was also the Director of the Social Policy and Urban Regeneration Research Institute (SPUR) in 2005–2009. He was featured in the 2017 Pinc List of leading LGBTQ figures in Wales.

Weeks was appointed Officer of the Order of the British Empire (OBE) in the 2012 Birthday Honours for services to social science.

Authored books
Socialism and the New Life (with Sheila Rowbotham), Pluto Press, 1977
Coming Out: Homosexual Politics in Britain from the Nineteenth Century to the Present, Quartet Books 1977; 2nd revised edition, with new chapter and bibliography, 1990
Sex, Politics and Society. The Regulation of Sexuality since 1800, Longman 1981; 2nd edition, with additional chapter and new bibliography, 1989
Sexuality and its Discontents: Meanings, Myths and Modern Sexualities, Routledge and Kegan Paul, 1985. Published in Spanish edition as El Malestar de la Sexualidad: Significados, Mitos y Sexualidades Modernas, Madrid, Talasa Ediciones S.L, 1993
Sexuality, Ellis Horwood/Tavistock, 1986. Published in Spanish translation as Sexualidad, Mexico City, PUEG/ Editorial Paidos, 1998. Published in Japanese, 1999. Revised second English edition, Routledge 2003
Between the Acts. Lives of Homosexual Men 1885-1967 (with Kevin Porter), Routledge, 1990; 2nd edition, with new Preface, Rivers Oram Press, 1998
Against Nature: Essays on History, Sexuality and Identity, Rivers Oram Press, 1991
Invented Moralities. Sexual Values in an Age of Uncertainty, UK: Polity Press, US: Columbia University Press, 1995
Making Sexual History, Polity Press, 2000, pp x + 256,  (HB), 0 7456 2115 5 (PB); Chinese language edition, Nanjing 2001
Same Sex Intimacies: Families of Choice and other Life Experiments (with Brian Heaphy and Catherine Donovan), Routledge, 2001, pp ix + 245,  (hbk), 0 415 25477 9 (pbk)
Sexuality, Revised second edition, pp xii + 164, Routledge 2003,  (hbk), 28286 1 (pbk). French translation : ""Sexualité"", Lyon, 2014.
The World we have won, Routledge 2007. Japanese translation, 2016.
Sexuality, Third edition, Routledge 2010.

References

External links
Jeffrey Weeks homepage at London Southbank University
Gay Left archive web site

1945 births
Living people
People from Rhondda
British Marxists
British sociologists
Welsh gay writers
LGBT studies academics
Officers of the Order of the British Empire
20th-century Welsh historians
Gay academics
21st-century Welsh historians